CativaNatureza, a company from Curitiba, Brazil, is pointed out as a reference in the Brazilian market of traceable cosmetics made of organic raw materials by the international press specialized in the area Besides being recognized by experts in the global market as one of the key-participants of the Brazilian organic industry. The organic sector, to which the company belongs to, is considered by specialists to be in full expansion in the country (data of July 2014).

History
Cativa Natureza is Brazil’s first chain of stores to sell cosmetics made of traceable organic raw materials. Founded in the beginning of 2008, by Rose Bezecry, in the Municipal Market of Curitiba – Paraná the Ecologic Capital. The company may be considered one of the first Brazilian brands in the sector of organic products in the country.

Awards
The company was awarded in 2010 by IBDN (Brazilian Institute of Nature's Preservation) for being the first retail chain of certified organic cosmetics in Brazil.

References

External links
Official Website
Mcspany Website

Brazilian brands
Cosmetics brands
Skin care brands
Product certification
Cosmetics companies of Brazil
Companies based in Curitiba
Retail companies established in 2008
Brazilian companies established in 2008